Kaffee Alt Wien is a traditional Viennese café located at Bäckerstraße 9 in the Innere Stadt first district in Vienna, Austria. It was established in 1936 by Leopold Hawelka and his wife Josefine on the day after their wedding. They ran the café until 1939 at which time they moved to Dorotheergasse, where they opened a new coffee house, the famous Café Hawelka.

The Alt Wien is nowadays not one of Vienna's chic coffee houses, but instead rather smoky and gloomy, and the clientele often includes bizarre characters. Consequently, in 1976, a notable happening by the Viennese artist Gottfried Helnwein took place in the café. Since the 1980s, the Kaffee Alt Wien has developed into a night café.

See also
 List of restaurants in Vienna

References 
 The information in this article is based on a translation of its German equivalent.

Coffeehouses and cafés in Vienna
Buildings and structures in Innere Stadt